Blue Wonder Power Milk is the second studio album by the Belgian band Hooverphonic, released on 11 May 1998 by Columbia Records. It is the band's first album with lead singer Geike Arnaert.

"Club Montepulciano", "This Strange Effect", "Eden", and "Lung" were released as singles from Blue Wonder Power Milk, with "Eden" peaking at number 12 on the Walloon Ultratop singles chart. The album was released in the United States on 11 August 1998 by Epic Records.

The photograph on the cover of the album is of the interior of the Atomium in Brussels.

Composition
MacKenzie Wilson of AllMusic characterised Blue Wonder Power Milk as an album of dream pop, indie pop, and trip hop music. Wilson wrote that the songs on the album are "intricately woven with string arrangements and pulsating dance club beats for a drowsy feel."

Track listing

Personnel
Credits are adapted from the album's liner notes.

Hooverphonic
 Geike Arnaert – vocals
 Alex Callier – guitars, string arrangements, programming, keyboards, vocals
 Frank Duchêne – keyboards, engineering, backing vocals
 Raymond Geerts – guitars

Additional musicians
 Herb Besson – trombone (tracks 2, 9)
 Eric Bosteels – drums and various percussion (tracks 1–6, 8, 9, 11, 12)
 Michael Davis – trombone (tracks 2, 9)
 Ryoji Hata – vocals (track 12)
 The Hooverphonic String Orchestra (Cristina Constantinescu, Claire Delplanque, Grietje François, Véronique Gilis, Tine Janssens, Jan Buysschaert, Herwig Coryn, Joost Cuypen, Henk De Bruycker, Patrick De Neef, Otto Derolez, Maurits Goossens, Karel Ingelaere, Bart Lemmens, Sofia Pevenage, Peter Van der Weerd, Gunther Van Rompaey, and Marc Tooten) – strings (tracks 1, 4, 5, 7, 9–12)
 Ronny Mosuse – bass (tracks 4, 10)
 Mark Plati – programming (tracks 2, 5, 8, 9, 12), rhythm programming (tracks 1, 10), acoustic guitar (tracks 4, 11), bass (tracks 6, 8), vocals (track 12)
 Dave Richards – upright bass (tracks 2, 3, 9)
 Mark Steylaerts – orchestra leader
 Alex Van Aeken – horns (tracks 5, 7, 10)
 Joris Van den Hauwe – conducting, oboe (tracks 2, 5)
 Rik Vercruysse – horns (tracks 5, 7, 10)

Production
 Jérôme Blondel – assistance
 Tony De Block – assistance
 Dante DeSole – assistance
 Jed Hackett – assistance
 Filip Heurckmans – assistance
 Hooverphonic – production, recording
 Bob Ludwig – mastering
 Mark Plati – production, mixing, recording
 Jean-Marie Quentin – assistance
 Tim Roggeman – assistance

Design
 Wim Allegaert – photography
 Power & Glory – corporate design

Charts

References

External links
 

1998 albums
Hooverphonic albums
Albums produced by Mark Plati
Columbia Records albums
Epic Records albums